Hageman Peak is a montane landform pinnacle rising to about  at the northwest end of the Staccato Peaks in southern Alexander Island, Antarctica. The peak was photographed from the air by Lincoln Ellsworth in 1935, and was named by the Advisory Committee on Antarctic Names for Lieutenant Commander Roger H. Hageman, U.S. Navy, an LC-130 aircraft commander during Operation Deep Freeze, 1969.

See also
 Saint George Peak
 Beagle Peak
 Giovanni Peak

References

Mountains of Alexander Island